Fótbolti.net is an Icelandic website that focuses on football. Headquartered in Reykjavík, it was founded in 2002 by Hafliði Breiðfjörð and quickly established itself as one of the most popular websites in Iceland.

Ownership
Fótbolti ehf., the company behind the website is 95% owned by Hafliði Breiðfjörð. The remaining 5% are owned by Magnús Már Einarsson.

References

External links
 

Association football websites
2002 establishments in Iceland
Icelandic websites
Sport in Iceland
Sport websites